United States competed at the 2019 Parapan American Games in Lima, Peru.

Medalists

Athletics

Sixty athletes and four guides represented the United States at the 2019 Parapan American Games.

Men's track

Men's field

Women's track

Women's field

Badminton

Men

Women

Cycling

Goalball

Judo

Powerlifting

Shooting

Sitting volleyball

Swimming

35 swimmers competed in multiple swimming events.

Men

Women

Table tennis

Men

Women

Taekwondo

Wheelchair basketball

The United States have qualified both the men's and women's teams.

Wheelchair rugby

Wheelchair tennis

Six wheelchair tennis players are expected to compete.

See also
United States at the 2019 Pan American Games

References

United States at the Pan American Games
2019 in American sports
Nations at the 2019 Parapan American Games